Accelerando is a studio album by Indian-American pianist Vijay Iyer recorded in 2011 and released on the ACT label in 2012.

Reception

The album received universal acclaim with Metacritic giving it a score of 88 from 9 reviews. Thom Jurek, in his review for AllMusic states, "Accelerando is a triumph in creativity and expert musicianship, and further underscores Iyer's status as a genuine jazz innovator". Writing for All About Jazz, Troy Collins said "Accelerando is a masterful collection that balances high-minded conceptualism with heartfelt conviction". The Guardian review by John Fordham awarded the album 4 stars noting "The world's full of fine jazz piano trios, but Iyer's is way up the A-list". PopMatters editor John Garratt said "Accelerando is an album filled with highlights... There is a reason Vijay Iyer keeps popping up on year-end best-of lists; it’s because he synthesizes such disparate styles, some easily palatable and some requiring more effort, into a striking vision of his own".

Track listing
All compositions by Vijay Iyer except as indicated
 "Bode" - 2:18  
 "Optimism" - 7:23  
 "The Star of a Story" (Rod Temperton) - 5:46  
 "Human Nature" (Steve Porcaro, John Bettis) - 9:39  
 "Wildflower" (Herbie Nichols) - 4:10  
 "Mmmhmm" (Stephen Bruner, Steve Ellison) - 4:33  
 "Little Pocket Size Demons" (Henry Threadgill) 7:14  
 "Lude" - 4:54  
 "Accelerando" - 2:51  
 "Actions Speak" - 5:38  
 "The Village of the Virgins" (Duke Ellington) - 5:17

Personnel
 Vijay Iyer — piano
Stephan Crump — bass
Marcus Gilmore — drums

References

2012 albums
Vijay Iyer albums
ACT Music albums
Instrumental albums